The Queensland State Netball Centre, also known commercially as Nissan Arena, is a multi-purpose facility located in the southern Brisbane suburb of Nathan. The centre features a 5,000 seat indoor arena that is the home court of Super Netball team the Queensland Firebirds, as well as National Basketball League club the Brisbane Bullets. It is the administrative headquarters of Netball Queensland and provides training facilities for elite-level and community-based netball clubs in Queensland.

Venue
In July 2015 the Queensland Government announced plans for the first ever dedicated home for netball in the state, which would cater for professional netball club the Queensland Firebirds and provide administrative offices for Netball Queensland and other facilities for emerging players and clubs in the region. The facility was also known as Brisbane Arena during the construction phase of the project. The government appointed Hansen Yuncken as the design and construction contractor in February 2017 and construction of the centre began later that year.

The main features of the venue include:

 Sunken show court with 5000 seat capacity from where major game events will be broadcast
 Eight indoor hard courts
 Cafe and food and beverage outlets
 Player and umpire changing facilities for both community and elite athletes
 Gymnasium for players
 Sports science and sports medicine facility for elite athlete activities
 Administration offices and parking facilities for Netball Queensland.

The centre was opened on 24 February 2019, with the final cost of construction coming in at $44 million.

Tenants

Netball
The precinct is the headquarters of Netball Queensland and Suncorp Super Netball side the Queensland Firebirds, who play all their home matches at the centre. It also became a training hub and home court for several other Super Netball teams during the 2020 season, who were forced to relocate matches to the venue as a result of the impact of the COVID-19 pandemic.

Basketball

National Basketball League side the Brisbane Bullets announced they would move all home games to the centre in July 2019, ahead of the start of the season later that year. The arrangement with Netball Queensland allows the Bullets to base themselves in the one facility, as opposed to training and playing at separate arenas in the past. The centre hosted a Harlem Globetrotters exhibition in 2019. The Bullets have nicknamed the arena The Armoury for home matches.

Boxing 
Various professional boxing events have also been held at the venue.

Other events
Netball Queensland has stated its intent to bring a range of indoor sporting and entertainment events to the venue. The Netball Centre hosted the Brisbane leg of the 2019 FIVB Volleyball Men's Nations League. The arena has hosted domestic indoor volleyball matches and was the site of the basketball and closing ceremony of the 2019 INAS Global Games.

Naming rights
The venue was referred to as the Queensland State Netball Centre during construction and in the first year of its operation. In October 2019 the Japanese car manufacturer Nissan secured the commercial naming rights to the centre, which was renamed the Nissan Arena. The arrangement is in place for three years.

See also

 Netball in Australia
 Queensland Sport and Athletics Centre

References

External links

 Official Website
 Queensland State Netball Centre – Austadiums Website

Brisbane Bullets
Basketball venues in Australia
Netball venues in Queensland
Queensland Firebirds
Multi-purpose stadiums in Australia
Tourist attractions in Brisbane
Sports venues in Brisbane
2019 establishments in Australia
National Basketball League (Australia) venues